The South Keeling Islands are a group of islands of the Cocos (Keeling) Islands, next to North Keeling, about  to the north.

The atoll consists of West, Home, South, Direction, and Horsburgh islands. West Island is the largest in the territory, with a length of 10 km (6 mi).

The South Keeling Islands have two inhabited islands with a combined population of 550, West Island and Home Island. The other islands are not permanently inhabited. A Malay ethnic group of just over 400 people live on the islands, the Cocos Malays, who live mainly in Bantam on Home Island. There are also about 150 Australians, most of whom live on West Island.

Notes 

Landforms of the Cocos (Keeling) Islands
Archipelagoes of Australia
Archipelagoes of the Indian Ocean